Serena and Venus Williams defeated the defending champions Cara Black and Liezel Huber in the final, 6–2, 6–2 to win the women's doubles tennis title at the 2009 US Open. It was their second US Open title together and tenth major title together overall. It was the second component in an eventual non-calendar-year Grand Slam for the sisters.

Seeds

Draw

Finals

Top half

Section 1

Section 2

Bottom half

Section 3

Section 4

External links 
 Main Draw
2009 US Open – Women's draws and results at the International Tennis Federation

Women's Doubles
US Open (tennis) by year – Women's doubles
2009 in women's tennis
2009 in American women's sports